is a Japanese football player for Tochigi SC.

Club statistics
Updated to 23 February 2016.

References

External links

Profile at Tochigi SC

1991 births
Living people
University of Tsukuba alumni
Association football people from Tochigi Prefecture
Japanese footballers
J1 League players
J3 League players
Kawasaki Frontale players
Tochigi SC players
Association football defenders